Lorenzo Del Prete (born 12 January 1986) is an Italian footballer who plays as a right back.

Career

Juventus
After an experience with the quality productive Juventus youth system, Del Prete was loaned out to Pizzighettone and Lanciano to gain experience through first team playing time in the lower divisions of the Italian league.

Siena
After some impressive performances Juventus opted to sell him in a co-ownership deal on 8 July 2008 to Serie A side Siena for €130,000, so he could gain experience at the highest level. He made his Serie A debut on the first day of the 2008–09 season in a defeat to Atalanta. His debut also activated the bonus clause regulated by FIGC, which Siena had to pay €18,000 per year to Monterotondo as Premio alla carriera. In June 2009 Siena bought him outright for another €130,000. Del Prete was signed by Frosinone in July 2009 along with Caetano Calil. On 15 July 2010 he was signed by Pescara. Circa 2010 Del Prete also renewed his contract to 30 June 2014.

In 2011 Del Prete returned to Siena for their pre-season camp. He also received no.32 shirt before he left the club again on 30 August 2011. Nocerina also received €10,000 performance bonus from Siena for the loan.

Novara
On 20 July 2012, Del Prete was sold to Novara for €600,000 in a 4-year contract. On the same time Siena signed Massimo Paci also for €600,000. On 22 January 2013 Del Prete was signed by Crotone in temporary deal. On 11 July 2013 the deal was renewed.

Perugia
On 18 July 2014, Del Prete was signed by Serie B newcomer Perugia.

Catania
On 2 February 2015, Del Prete left for fellow second division club Catania in a -year contract.

Juventus U23
On 9 October 2018, Del Prete joined Serie C side Juventus U23.

Trapani
On 16 August 2019, he signed a 2-year contract with Trapani.

Return to Novara
On 1 April 2022, Del Prete returned to Novara in Serie D until the end of the season. After making a 5-minute substitute appearance two days later, he was not included in the matchday squad for the rest of the season.

Footnotes

References

External links
 A.C. Siena Official Player Profile  
 La Gazzetta Dello Sport Player Profile (2007–08 season) 
 Lega Serie B profile 

1986 births
Living people
Footballers from Rome
Italian footballers
Association football fullbacks
Serie A players
Serie B players
Serie C players
Serie D players
Juventus F.C. players
A.S. Pizzighettone players
S.S. Virtus Lanciano 1924 players
A.C.N. Siena 1904 players
Frosinone Calcio players
Delfino Pescara 1936 players
A.S.G. Nocerina players
Novara F.C. players
F.C. Crotone players
A.C. Perugia Calcio players
Catania S.S.D. players
Juventus Next Gen players
Trapani Calcio players
Calcio Foggia 1920 players